Steve Hickey (born 28 October 1965) is  a former Australian rules footballer who played with North Melbourne in the Victorian Football League (VFL). 	

Hickey was captain / coach of Benalla All Blacks Football Club in 1995 in the Tungamah Football League, winning their senior football best and fairest award.

Hickey was then captain / coach of Benalla in the Ovens & Murray Football League in 1996 and 1997.

Hickey coached Glenrowan Football Club in the Ovens & King Football League in 2009 and 2010.

Notes

External links 		
		
		
		
		
		
		
Living people		
1965 births		
		
Australian rules footballers from Victoria (Australia)		
North Melbourne Football Club players
Benalla Football Club players